My Father's Happy Years is a 1977 Hungarian drama film directed by Sándor Simó. It was entered into the 28th Berlin International Film Festival.

Cast
 Eszter Szakács - Anya, Törökné
 Loránd Lohinszky - Apa, Török János
 Irma Patkós - Irma néni
 Judit Meszléry - Ilus, Szekeres felesége
 Dezső Garas - Martin doktor
 Georgiana Tarjan - Jutka (as Györgyi Tarján)
 István Bujtor - Negrelli Zsiga
 József Madaras - Szekeres Ede
 Péter Harsányi - Fiú
 Péter Andorai - Varga Ernő, kommunista
 Péter Müller
 Tamás Dunai - A gyárigazgató fia

References

External links

1977 films
1970s Hungarian-language films
1977 drama films
Films directed by Sándor Simó
Hungarian drama films